Simon Graves Jensen (born 22 May 1999) is a Danish professional footballer who plays for  club Palermo, as a centre-back.

Club career

Years in Denmark
Graves started playing football at Holstebro Boldklub before joining the Randers FC youth academy at under-17 level. In January 2018, he signed his first professional contract, a three-year deal. He made his professional debut on 11 September 2018 in a Danish Cup match against Næsby Boldklub. He started in Centre-back|central defense that day as his team won in a penalty-shootout. On 4 November, he played his first match in the Danish Superliga, the top level of Danish football, against AGF. He came on as a substitute for Saba Lobzhanidze in a 2–0 win.

On 26 June 2020, Graves extended his contract with Randers until 2024.

Graves scored his first professional goal on 16 September 2021 in a 2–2 home draw against AZ Alkmaar in the UEFA Europa Conference League group stage.

Palermo
On 30 January 2023, Graves signed a four-and-a-half year deal with Italian Serie B club Palermo.

International career
On 16 January 2018, Graves made his Denmark U19 debut during a 1–0 win over Cyprus in a friendly in Ayia Napa.

Career statistics

Honours
Randers
 Danish Cup: 2020–21

References

1999 births
People from Holstebro
Sportspeople from the Central Denmark Region
Living people
Danish men's footballers
Denmark youth international footballers
Association football defenders
Holstebro BK players
Randers FC players
Palermo F.C. players
Danish Superliga players
Danish expatriate men's footballers
Expatriate footballers in Italy
Danish expatriate sportspeople in Italy